is a railway station in the city of Susono, Shizuoka Prefecture, Japan, operated by the East Japan Railway Company (JR Tōkai ).

Lines

Station layout
The station has a single island platform connected to the station building by a footbridge. The station was originally located on a switchback, which was eliminated when the line was electrified in 1968, and the platform realigned; a vestigal remnant of the former switchback is retained as a side track to the north of the station. The station building has automated ticket machines, TOICA automated turnstiles and a staffed ticket office.

Platforms

History 
Iwanami Station began opened on December 8, 1944. Along with its division and privatization of JNR on April 1, 1987, the station came under the control and operation of JR Central. The current station building dates from 1989.

Station numbering was introduced to the Gotemba Line in March 2018; Iwanami Station was assigned station number CB13.

Passenger statistics
In fiscal 2017, the station was used by an average of 2134 passengers daily (boarding passengers only).

Surrounding area
Japan National Route 246
Toyota Motor East Japan Higashi-Fuji plant

See also
 List of Railway Stations in Japan

References

External links

 Official website 

Railway stations in Japan opened in 1944
Railway stations in Shizuoka Prefecture
Gotemba Line
Stations of Central Japan Railway Company
Susono, Shizuoka